The Men's slalom competition of the Lillehammer 1994 Olympics was held at Hafjell.

The defending world champion was Kjetil André Aamodt of Norway, while Sweden's Thomas Fogdoe was the defending World Cup slalom champion and Alberto Tomba champion of the 1994 World Cup.

Results

References 

Men's slalom
Winter Olympics